Yeshivat Aderet Eliyahu (ישיבת אדרת אליהו), commonly referred to as "Zilberman's," is a Haredi, Lithuanian educational facility located between the Jewish and Muslim quarters of the Old City of Jerusalem.

The yeshiva encompasses three buildings, including the main beis midrash (study hall) called "Galicia," as well as a yeshiva ketana (yeshiva high school), near the Armenian quarter, and an elementary school, also in the Old City. 

Although in many ways a traditional Haredi yeshiva, it differs from most yeshivas in its commitment to following the teachings of the Vilna Gaon.  In addition, Zilberman's is well known for endorsing the newly found Techelet (blue dye extracted from sea snails and used to color fringes of tzitzit) as authentic and encouraging its students to wear tzitzit dyed with it.  Wearing tefillin (phylacteries) throughout the day is also encouraged, unlike most yeshivas where tefillin is only worn briefly for morning prayer. Zilberman's also features a simpler, more straightforward teaching method for Talmud and the Bible.  Returning to traditional teaching methods abandoned by the Yeshiva world, students of Zilberman's have a set study schedule including Torah, "Nach" (Prophets and Writings), Mishnah and Talmud; the method of Talmud study does not involve intense scrutiny of commentaries and has more focus on the text itself.  

The yeshiva was founded in the 1970s by Rabbi Yitzhak Shlomo Zilberman. As he was orphaned as a teenager, he did not grow up with the guidance of any specific sect of Orthodoxy, and was able to search independently to find what he felt was the most accurate stream of Judaism.  Eventually he found the Vilna Gaon's teachings to be by far the most faithful to Judaism, and founded the yeshiva and yeshiva ketana.  

Since then, many new schools have been established throughout Israel and in Jewish communities abroad based on the model of Zilberman's. Some of these schools do not share Zilberman's Haredi, ultra-orthodox character, and many are associated with the National Religious and Settler movements. Three of these schools were founded by students of Rabbi Zilberman; one in Beit El (dedicated to Rabbi Binyamin Kahane), one in Yitzhar and one in Hebron now administered by Baruch Marzel.  The largest, the Beit El yeshiva, has nearly 250 students (as of September 2007). 

Despite its own strong right wing and nationalistic leanings (many of its younger students are affiliated with or sympathetic towards the Hill-top settler movement), Zilberman's is firmly Haredi/ultra-orthodox. Following Rabbi Avigdor Nevenzahl's ban on entering the Temple Mount, Zilberman's followed suit.

After Rabbi Zilberman's death in the late 1990s, his sons took over management and leadership of the yeshiva.

References

External links
 The four questions from archived Official Website
 Talmud Torah Aderes Eliyahu archived Official Website

1970s establishments in Asia
Haredi Judaism in Jerusalem
Haredi yeshivas
Orthodox yeshivas in Jerusalem
Lithuanian-Jewish culture in Jerusalem